The Automobile Dealer Economic Rights Restoration Act (ADERRA), House Bill HR2743 and Senate Bill S1304, were introduced in the 111th United States Congress to restore the economic rights of car dealers.

Congressman Frank Kratovil (D-MD) and Congressman Dan Maffei (D-NY) introduced H.R.2743 with Majority Leader Steny Hoyer (D-MD).

Background
Pursuant to their loan agreement with the U.S. Treasury and as a condition of receiving additional TARP funding, General Motors and Chrysler corporations announced the closure of automobile dealerships in June 2009, and instructed dealerships to either close in 26 days (Chrysler) or participate in a "wind down" agreement until October 2010 (GM) at which time franchise agreements would not be renewed.

Behind the legislation 
Legislation was drafted using Arent Fox bankruptcy attorneys in Washington, DC.  Dealers created a small committee including Spitzer Automotive Family, DARCARS Automotive Family and Fitzgerald Automotive Family.  The National Automobile Dealers Association (NADA) also supported the legislation, as well as National Association of Minority Auto Dealers (NAMAD).

Congressional hearings
Hearings were held by Senator Jay Rockefeller (D-WV) during which the Senator questions the criteria of selection, time allowed and the validity of the reasons for closure. As a result of the hearing, a group of automobile dealers worked with Congressional representatives to draft legislation that would allow franchises to be reinstated at the dealer's request, but at the same time would not prevent the sale of assets in the US Bankruptcy court, or the merger of Chrysler with Fia (SPA).

As the Congress came to a close, members of the Committee to Restore Dealer Rights (CRDR) met with members of the Auto Task Force who aided in Senator Durbin being assigned to handle a potentially non-legislative solution in the Senate, along with majority Leader Hoyer in the House of Representatives.  Negotiations were terminated by the manufacturers who announced a unilateral process that was not acceptable to members of Congress.

Passage
At the 11th hour, HR3288 sec.747 was adopted in a conference committee and signed into law by President Barack Obama on December 18, 2009 providing the opportunity for dealers who were closed to seek arbitration.

The office of the Inspector General released a report and stated on page 33 that the options presented by the Auto Task Force about closing dealers were a "false dilemma with no factual support."

See also 
 National Association of Minority Auto Dealers
 National Automobile Dealers Association

Notes

References 
 
   Jack Fitzgerald on the dealers that remained after the bankruptcy.
 Jack taking on Task Force video on MSN of Jack Fitzgerald Auto Dealer taking on Task Force
 Video of Fitzgerald taking on CEO's
 Article describing the plight of dealers
  discusses dealers going to Capital Hill

External links
 The Committee's website
 HR2743 and S1403 111th Congress
 Inspector General Report on Factors Affecting Dealer Closures by Auto Task Force

United States federal commerce legislation
Automotive industry in the United States
Auto dealerships
Proposed legislation of the 111th United States Congress
United States federal legislation articles without infoboxes